Philip Warren Anderson  (December 13, 1923 – March 29, 2020) was an American theoretical physicist and Nobel laureate. Anderson made contributions to the theories of localization, antiferromagnetism, symmetry breaking (including a paper in 1962 discussing symmetry breaking in particle physics, leading to the development of the Standard Model around 10 years later), and high-temperature superconductivity, and to the philosophy of science through his writings on emergent phenomena. Anderson is also responsible for naming the field of physics that is now known as condensed matter physics.

Education and early life
Anderson was born in Indianapolis, Indiana, and grew up in Urbana, Illinois. His father, Harry Warren Anderson, was a professor of plant pathology at the University of Illinois at Urbana; his maternal grandfather was a mathematician at Wabash College, where Anderson's father studied; and his maternal uncle was a Rhodes Scholar who became a professor of English, also at Wabash College. He graduated from University Laboratory High School in Urbana in 1940. Under the encouragement of a math teacher by the name of Miles Hartley, Anderson enrolled at Harvard University to study under a fully-funded scholarship. He concentrated in "Electronic Physics" and completed his B.S. in 1943, after which he was drafted into the war effort and built antennas at the Naval Research Laboratory until the end of the Second World War in 1945. As an undergraduate, his close associates included particle-nuclear physicist H. Pierre Noyes, philosopher and historian of science Thomas Kuhn and molecular physicist Henry Silsbee. After the war, Anderson returned to Harvard to pursue graduate studies in physics under the mentorship of John Hasbrouck van Vleck; he received his Ph.D. in 1949 after completing a doctoral dissertation titled "The theory of pressure broadening of spectral lines in the microwave and infrared regions."

Career and research
From 1949 to 1984, Anderson was employed by Bell Laboratories in New Jersey, where he worked on a wide variety of problems in condensed matter physics. During this period he developed what is now called Anderson localization (the idea that extended states can be localized by the presence of disorder in a system) and Anderson's theorem (concerning impurity scattering in superconductors); invented the Anderson Hamiltonian, which describes the site-wise interaction of electrons in a transition metal; proposed symmetry breaking within particle physics (this played a role in the development of the Standard Model and the development of the theory behind the Higgs mechanism, which in turn generates mass in some elementary particles); created the pseudospin approach to the BCS theory of superconductivity; made seminal studies of non-s-wave pairing (both symmetry-breaking and microscopic mechanism) in the superfluidity of He3, and helped found the area of spin-glasses. He was elected a Fellow of the American Academy of Arts and Sciences in 1963.

Anderson spent a year as lecturer in Cambridge in 1961–1962, and recalled that having Brian Josephson in a class was "a disconcerting experience for a lecturer, I can assure you, because everything had to be right or he would come up and explain it to me after class." Anderson was elected a Fellow of the American Academy of Arts and Sciences in 1963.

From 1967 to 1975, Anderson was a professor of theoretical physics at Cambridge University. In 1977 Anderson was awarded the Nobel Prize in Physics for his investigations into the electronic structure of magnetic and disordered systems, which allowed for the development of electronic switching and memory devices in computers. Co-researchers Sir Nevill Francis Mott and John van Vleck shared the award with him. In 1982, he was awarded the National Medal of Science. He retired from Bell Labs in 1984 and was Joseph Henry Professor Emeritus of Physics at Princeton University.

Anderson's writings included Concepts in Solids, Basic Notions of Condensed Matter Physics and The Theory of Superconductivity in the High-Tc Cuprates. Anderson served on the board of advisors of Scientists and Engineers for America, an organization focused on promoting sound science in American government.

In response to the discovery of high-temperature superconductors in 1980s, Anderson proposed Resonating valence bond (RVB) theory to explain the phenomenon. While many found the idea unconvincing,  RVB theory proved instrumental in the study of spin liquids.

Anderson also made conceptual contributions to the philosophy of science through his explication of emergent phenomena, which became an inspiration for the science of complex systems. In 1972 he wrote an article called "More is Different" in which he emphasized the limitations of reductionism and the existence of hierarchical levels of science, each of which requires its own fundamental principles for advancement.

In 1984 he participated in the founding workshops of the Santa Fe Institute, a multidisciplinary research institute dedicated to the science of complex systems. Anderson also co-chaired the institute's 1987 conference on economics with Kenneth Arrow and W. Brian Arthur, and participated in its 2007 workshop on models of emergent behavior in complex systems.

In 1987, Anderson testified to the US Congress, "against the construction of the Superconducting Super Collider (SSC), a 40 TeV proton-proton collider in Texas that would have been the biggest experiment in particle physics. Anderson's opposition to the SSC did not directly lead to its cancellation in 1993—spiralling costs were the main factor - but he was perhaps its most high-profile opponent." He was, "skeptical of the supposed boost it would provide to science in the US and the claim that the spin-offs would provide great return on investment."

A 2006 statistical analysis of scientific research papers by José Soler, comparing the number of references in a paper to the number of citations, declared Anderson to be the "most creative" amongst ten most cited physicists in the world. In 2021 Oxford University Press published the biography A Mind over Matter: Philip Anderson and the Physics of the Very Many by Andrew Zangwill.

Awards and honors
He was awarded the Oliver E. Buckley Condensed Matter Prize in 1964, the Nobel Prize in Physics in 1977, the Golden Plate Award of the American Academy of Achievement in 1978, was elected a Foreign Member of the Royal Society (ForMemRS) in 1980, and was elected a member of the American Philosophical Society in 1991. He was awarded the National Medal of Science in 1982.

Personal life
Anderson was an atheist and was one of 22 Nobel Laureates who signed the Humanist Manifesto. Anderson was also interested in Japanese culture, living there for a time and becoming a 1st Dan master of the board game Go.  The Nihon Ki-in awarded him a lifetime achievement award in 2007, and Anderson joked that there were only four people in Japan who could beat him.

He died in Princeton, New Jersey, on March 29, 2020, at the age of 96.

Publications

Books

Journal articles 
  Pdf.
  Pdf.
  Pdf.
  Pdf.
  Pdf.
  Pdf.
 
 
  
  Pdf.

References

External links 

  including the Nobel Lecture, December 8, 1977 Local Moments and Localized States
 Philip Warren Anderson
 Video clip of Philip Anderson speaking at the International Conference on Complex Systems, Hosted by the New England Complex Systems Institute (NECSI)
 Oral History interview transcript for Philip W. Anderson on 10 May 1988, American Institute of Physics, Niels Bohr Library and Archives
 Oral History interview transcript for Philip W. Anderson on 15 and 29 October and 5 November 1999, American Institute of Physics, Niels Bohr Library and Archives - Session I
 Oral History interview transcript with Philip W. Anderson on 8 March 2002, American Institute of Physics, Niels Bohr Library and Archives - Session II
 Oral History interview transcript with Philip W. Anderson on 22 March 2002, American Institute of Physics, Niels Bohr Library and Archives - Session III
 Oral History interview transcript with Philip W. Anderson on 29 May 2002, American Institute of Physics, Niels Bohr Library and Archives - Session IV
 Oral History interview transcript with Philip W. Anderson on 30 March 1999, American Institute of Physics, Niels Bohr Library and Archives - Session I
 Oral History interview transcript with Philip W. Anderson on 30 May 1999, American Institute of Physics, Niels Bohr Library and Archives - Session II
 Oral History interview transcript with Philip W. Anderson on 23 November 1999, American Institute of Physics, Niels Bohr Library and Archives - Session III
 Oral History interview transcript with Philip W. Anderson on 29 June 2000, American Institute of Physics, Niels Bohr Library and Archives - Session IV

1923 births
2020 deaths
Members of the United States National Academy of Sciences
American atheists
American Go players
American Nobel laureates
21st-century American physicists
Foreign Members of the Royal Society
Fellows of the American Academy of Arts and Sciences
Foreign Members of the Russian Academy of Sciences
Foreign Fellows of the Indian National Science Academy
Fellows of Churchill College, Cambridge
Fellows of Jesus College, Cambridge
Harvard University alumni
National Medal of Science laureates
Nobel laureates in Physics
Writers from Indianapolis
Writers from Urbana, Illinois
Princeton University faculty
Scientists at Bell Labs
University Laboratory High School (Urbana, Illinois) alumni
Theoretical physicists
Oliver E. Buckley Condensed Matter Prize winners
Santa Fe Institute people
United States Navy personnel of World War II
Members of the American Philosophical Society